Day by Day is an album by Nigerian musician Femi Kuti released in mid-October 2008.

Track listing
All tracks by Femi Kuti

 "Oyimbo" – 3:53
 "Eh Oh" – 4:17
 "Day by Day" – 3:01
 "Demo Crazy" – 7:34
 "Do You Know" – 4:52
 "You Better Ask Yourself" – 6:00
 "One Two" – 2:15
 "Tell Me" – 4:37
 "They Will Run" – 5:25
 "Tension Grip Africa" – 5:07
 "Dem Funny" – 4:19
 "Let's Make History" – 2:28

Personnel 

 Ademola Adegbola– Guitar
 Bose Ajila – Background Vocals 
 Celine Bary – Background Vocals
 Philippe Bordas – Portraits
 Thomas Bubar – Assistant
 Vaughan Davies – Photo Courtesy
 Jacques Djeyim – Guitar
 Seb Dupuis – Editing
 Debo Folorunsho – Percussion, Drums
 Kunle Ogon Fuyi – Photo Courtesy
 Patrick Goraguer – Percussion, Keyboards, Fender Rhodes
 Guillaume Jaoul – Assistant
 Xavier Bernard Jaoul – Assistant
 Keziah Jones – Guitar
 Femi Kuti – Organ, Trumpet, Alto, Baritone, Soprano & Tenor Saxophones, Vocals
 Made Anikulapo Kuti – Alto Saxophone, Vocals
 Yeni Anikulapo Kuti – Background Vocals
 Gbenga Laleye – Trumpet
 Doris Lanzman – Background Vocals
 Morgan Marchand – Programming, Engineer, Additional Production
 Sébastien Martel – Guitar
 Bernard Matussiere – Photography
 Vladmir Nesckovic – Programming, Engineer, Additional Production
 Guy N'Sangue – Bass
 Tiwalade Ogunlowo – Trombone
 Kunle Olayode – Percussion, Drums
 Francis Onah – Tenor Saxophone
 Positive Force – Performer
 Julia Saar – Background Vocals
 Camille Sarr – Background Vocals
 Gérald Sebastien – Assistant
 Sodi – Programming, Producer, Engineer, Mixing
 Onome Udi – Background Vocals 

2008 albums
Femi Kuti albums
Wrasse Records albums
Afrobeat albums
Yoruba-language albums